The 2022 season saw Southern Vipers compete in the 50 over Rachael Heyhoe Flint Trophy, of which they were defending champions, and the Twenty20 Charlotte Edwards Cup. In the Charlotte Edwards Cup, the side went unbeaten through the six group stage matches, therefore qualifying directly for the final. In the final, they beat Central Sparks by 5 wickets with 4.1 overs to spare, therefore claiming their first Charlotte Edwards Cup title. 

In the Rachael Heyhoe Flint Trophy, the side finished third in the group, winning five of their seven matches and therefore qualifying for the play-off. They beat South East Stars in the play-off by six wickets, therefore setting up a final against Northern Diamonds, the third such Rachael Heyhoe Flint Trophy final encounter in three years.  However, having won the last two finals, this time Vipers lost, by 2 runs.

The side was captained by Georgia Adams and coached by Charlotte Edwards. They played four home matches at the Rose Bowl and three at the County Ground, Hove.

Squad

Changes
On 29 October 2021, it was announced that Charlie Dean had been awarded a professional contract with the side, having previously been on a temporary contract. On 27 April 2022, it was announced that Anya Shrubsole had signed for the side in a player-coach role, joining from Western Storm. The side announced their 17-player squad for the season on 10 May 2022: joining the team permanently was Nancy Harman from Lightning and Freya Kemp from the Academy, with Chloe Hill joining on loan from Central Sparks for the Charlotte Edwards Cup. Meanwhile, Ella Chandler, Ariana Dowse, Chiara Green, Gemma Lane, Cassidy McCarthy, Sophie Mitchelmore, Finty Trussler and Abbie Whybrow were no longer in the squad. In July 2022, Emily Windsor went on loan to Lightning for the first match of the Rachael Heyhoe Flint Trophy, whilst Chloe Hill's loan was extended to cover the whole of the Rachael Heyhoe Flint Trophy. Ella Chandler, Gemma Lane and Finty Trussler returned to the squad during the Rachael Heyhoe Flint Trophy, with all three players being named in a matchday squad on 16 July. Ariana Dowse later returned to the squad during the Rachael Heyhoe Flint Trophy, first being named in a matchday squad on 23 July. Mary Taylor was first included in a matchday squad on 16 September.

Squad list
 Age given is at the start of Southern Vipers' first match of the season (14 May 2022).

Charlotte Edwards Cup

Group B

 advanced to the final

Fixtures

Final

Tournament statistics

Batting

Source: ESPN Cricinfo Qualification: 50 runs.

Bowling

Source: ESPN Cricinfo Qualification: 5 wickets.

Rachael Heyhoe Flint Trophy

Season standings

 advanced to final
 advanced to the play-off

Fixtures

Play-off

Final

Tournament statistics

Batting

Source: ESPN Cricinfo Qualification: 100 runs.

Bowling

Source: ESPN Cricinfo Qualification: 5 wickets.

Season statistics

Batting

Bowling

Fielding

Wicket-keeping

References

Southern Vipers seasons
2022 in English women's cricket